Herbert Sandler (November 16, 1931 – June 5, 2019) was a co-CEO (with his wife, Marion Sandler) of Golden West Financial Corporation and World Savings Bank. He died on June 4, 2019, at the age of 87.

Education 
Sandler graduated from Stuyvesant High School in New York City and the City College of New York in 1951. He graduated from Columbia Law School in 1954.Herbert Sandler Obituary, San Francisco Chronicle, June 6, 2019Langer, Emily; Bernstein, Adam,"Herbert Sandler, S&L magnate who also seeded ProPublica, dies at 87", The Washington Post, 
June 5, 2019

Career
In 1963, the Sandlers created Golden West Financial Corporation, a savings and loan holding company, to acquire Golden West Savings and Loan Association, the predecessor to World Savings Bank. Since that time, Golden West grew into one of the largest thrifts in the U.S. with assets of approximately $125 billion, deposits of $60 billion, and 12,000 employees. Under the Sandlers' management, Golden West generated a 19 percent average annual compound growth in earnings per share over a 39-year period. The company was described as "one of the most efficient and productive money machines on the planet",<ref>[https://www.amazon.com/Less-More-Jason-Jennings/dp/1591840309 "Less is More]</ref> and was included 10 times in Fortune magazine's annual list of the United States' most admired companies. The Sandlers were also named "2004 CEOs of the Year" by Morningstar, Inc.

In an article on the death of Marion Sandler, Ryan Mac of Forbes'' notes that Golden West "instituted borrowing practices that were largely blamed for the housing market collapse".

Golden West was sold in 2006 for $24 billion to Wachovia Bank and the acquisition was completed in October 2006. The Sandlers owned about 10% of the company at the time of the sale, making their share of the sale price worth about $2.4 billion. Of this the Sandlers gave $1.3 billion to the Sandler Foundation.

Philanthropic work
The Sandlers helped found and are among the largest benefactors of the Center for Responsible Lending, a nonprofit, nonpartisan organization fighting predatory mortgage lending, payday loans, and other products that prey on consumers; the Center for American Progress, a progressive think tank; ProPublica, an investigative reporting newsroom; and the American Asthma Foundation.  In addition, the Sandlers or their foundation support organizations involved in medical research, the environment, human rights, and civil liberties.

References and notes

1931 births
2019 deaths
20th-century philanthropists
21st-century philanthropists
American bankers
American billionaires
American chief executives of financial services companies
City College of New York alumni
Columbia Law School alumni
Giving Pledgers